KK Crvena zvezda in the National Leagues shows records and statistics of Serbian men's professional basketball club Crvena zvezda in the domestic competition system. The Crvena zvezda squads have won 21 National League championships, including 10-in-a-row and current 6-in-a-row sequences. They have played three different National Leagues since 1945, including Yugoslav First Federal League (1945–1992), First League of Serbia and Montenegro (1992–2006) and Serbian League (2006 onward).

Overview 
Note: Statistics are correct through the end of the 2020–21 season.

Competitions

Yugoslavia (1945–1991)

Standings (1945–1981) 

Source: Crvena zvezda

Standings (1981–1991) 

Source: Crvena zvezda

Positions by year

Serbia and Montenegro (1991–2006)

Standings 

Source: Crvena zvezda

Positions by year

Serbia (2006–present)

Standings

Positions by year

Individual awards

Serbia and Montenegro 
MVP

Most Improved Player

Young MVP

Serbia  
Super League MVP

Finals MVP

See also 
 KK Crvena zvezda in the ABA League

References

League
Basketball League of Serbia accomplishments and records by team
First Federal Basketball League